The men's team Nordic combined competition for the 1988 Winter Olympics in Calgary was held at Canada Olympic Park and Canmore Nordic Centre on 23 and 24 February.

Results

Ski jumping
Each of the three team members performed three jumps, with the top two scores counting. The scores for each team were combined and used to calculate their deficit in the cross-country skiing portion of the event. Each point difference between teams in the ski jumping portion in this event resulted in a six-second difference in the cross country part of the event.

Cross-country

Each member of the team completed a ten kilometre cross-country skiing leg.

References

Nordic combined at the 1988 Winter Olympics